Leadore is an incorporated small town in Lemhi County, Idaho, United States. The population was 105 at the 2010 census.

History

The town of Leadore dates from 1910, when the Gilmore and Pittsburgh Railroad was constructed from Armstead, Montana, over Bannock Pass and into the Lemhi Valley. This occurred because the original location for the train station in the town of Junction had to be altered when the owner of the land refused to sell. The town was home to the railroad's repair shops, and was the point where the railroad's branch line to Gilmore connected with the main line. Though the railroad ceased operating in 1939, Leadore has remained the largest town in the immediate area.

In 2001 a replica of the town's old railway station was constructed in Leadore. The new building serves as the town's community center.

Geography
Leadore is located in southeastern Lemhi County at  (44.679604, -113.360664), in the Lemhi Valley. The Lemhi River flows through the northeast side of the city, running northwest to join the Salmon River at Salmon, Idaho.

Idaho State Highway 28 (Railroad Street) passes through the center of Leadore, leading northwest  to Salmon, the county seat, and southeast  to Interstate 15 at Sage Junction. Idaho State Highway 29 leads northeast from Leadore  to the Montana state line at Bannock Pass on the Continental Divide.

Climate
Leadore has a steppe climate (BSk) according to the Köppen climate classification system.

Demographics

2010 census
As of the census of 2010, there were 105 people, 48 households, and 24 families residing in the city. The racial makeup of the city was 100.0% White.

There were 48 households, of which 29.2% had children under the age of 18 living with them, 41.7% were married couples living together, 2.1% had a female householder with no husband present, 6.3% had a male householder with no wife present, and 50.0% were non-families. 50.0% of all households were made up of individuals, and 31.3% had someone living alone who was 65 years of age or older. The average household size was 2.19 and the average family size was 3.38.

The median age in the city was 41.3 years. 27.6% of residents were under the age of 18; 6.7% were between the ages of 18 and 24; 20.1% were from 25 to 44; 25.8% were from 45 to 64; and 20% were 65 years of age or older. The gender makeup of the city was 51.4% male and 48.6% female.

2000 census
As of the census of 2000, there were 90 people, 43 households, and 20 families residing in the city. The racial makeup of the city was 100.00% White.

There were 43 households, out of which 23.3% had children under the age of 18 living with them, 41.9% were married couples living together, 2.3% had a female householder with no husband present, and 51.2% were non-families. 46.5% of all households were made up of individuals, and 20.9% had someone living alone who was 65 years of age or older. The average household size was 2.09 and the average family size was 3.10.

In the city, the population was spread out, with 24.4% under the age of 18, 1.1% from 18 to 24, 24.4% from 25 to 44, 28.9% from 45 to 64, and 21.1% who were 65 years of age or older. The median age was 46 years. For every 100 females, there were 91.5 males. For every 100 females age 18 and over, there were 100.0 males.

The median income for a household in the city was $11,786, and the median income for a family was $13,750. Males had a median income of $32,188 versus $16,250 for females. The per capita income for the city was $9,452. There were 47.6% of families and 44.8% of the population living below the poverty line, including 50.0% of under eighteens and 28.6% of those over 64.

See also
 List of cities in Idaho

Notable People
Dennis M. Hilliard, District Ranger for the USDA Forest Service Leadore Ranger District from March 2003 through June 2008. First President of the Upper Lemhi River Chamber of Commerce, service from April 2004 through June 2008. Volunteer Fire Fighter for the Leadore Community Volunteer Fire Department from 2003 through June 2008. Dennis was one of the founders of the Eastern Idaho Houndsman Association. An avid hunter and houndsman who raised Bluetick Coonhounds. Dennis served in the Vietnam War from 1969-1971.

References

See also

Cities in Idaho
Cities in Lemhi County, Idaho